Pterospoda is a genus of moths in the family Geometridae first described by Harrison Gray Dyar Jr. in 1903.

Species
Pterospoda kunzei (Hulst, 1898)
Pterospoda nigrescens (Hulst, 1898)
Pterospoda opuscularia (Hulst, 1887)

References

Caberini